Michael George Summerbee  (born 15 December 1942) is an English former footballer, who played in the successful Manchester City side of the late 1960s and early 1970s.

Club career
Summerbee was born in Preston, Lancashire, and raised in Cheltenham, Gloucestershire, he attended Naunton Park Secondary Modern School where he was influenced by sports teacher, Arnold Wills, with whom he was publicly reunited 50 years later when Summerbee was Guest of Honour at the 150th anniversary celebrations of Cheltenham YMCA, to which both had belonged in their youth. Summerbee made his league debut playing for Swindon Town in 1959 at the age of 16. He made more than 200 appearances for the Wiltshire club, scoring 38 goals. In 1965 Manchester City manager Joe Mercer signed Summerbee for a fee of £35,000. In his first Manchester City season Summerbee started every match, the only Manchester City player to do so that season.

Playing on the right wing, Summerbee was one of the most influential players in the Manchester City side which won four trophies in three seasons from 1968 to 1970. Something of a practical joker, Summerbee (or "Buzzer" as teammates nicknamed him) was also known for a fiery temperament, a trait described by teammate Francis Lee as "retaliating first". Summerbee left Manchester City in June 1975, moving to Burnley, for a £25,000 fee, after making more than 400 appearances for City.

Summerbee signed for Blackpool on Christmas Eve 1976. The transfer had been the Blackpool chairman's idea, not that of manager Allan Brown. Summerbee later admitted that he should not have joined the club. He made just three League appearances for the Seasiders.

Summerbee ended his footballing career at Stockport County, where he was player-manager in the 1978–79 season. In 1980, he returned to the game for a single match, playing for non-League Mossley in their single goal FA Cup defeat of Crewe Alexandra.

International career
Over a five-year period, which encompassed the 1970 World Cup Summerbee played for England eight times. He made his international debut against Scotland in front of 134,000 spectators at Hampden Park on 24 February 1968, and helped to secure a 1–1 draw to clinch qualification to UEFA Euro 1968.

Later life
Off the pitch, Summerbee has been involved with a number of business ventures with varying degrees of success, including a period where he co-owned a menswear business with George Best. Summerbee is now the Club Ambassador for Manchester City.

Summerbee also starred in the cult film Escape to Victory alongside Sylvester Stallone, Michael Caine and Pelé.

Summerbee's son, Nicky, was also a professional footballer, who followed in his father's footsteps by playing for both Swindon Town and Manchester City before joining Sunderland. His father, George, and uncle, Gordon, were both lower-division players whose careers were affected by the outbreak of war.

Career statistics

As a player
Source:

As a manager
Source:

Honours
Awards
Swindon Town F.C. Player of the Season: 1964–65
Swindon Town Top Scorer: 1964–65
Manchester City F.C. Player of the Year: 1972, 1973
Manchester City F.C. Hall of Fame: 2004 (inducted)
English Football Hall of Fame: 2013 (inducted)
UEFA European Championship third place: 1968
Order of the British Empire

Manchester City
 Second Division champions: 1965–66
 First Division champions: 1967–68
 FA Cup winners: 1969
 League Cup winners: 1970
 UEFA Cup Winners' Cup winners: 1970
 FA Charity Shield winners: 1968, 1972

Summerbee was appointed Officer of the Order of the British Empire (OBE) in the 2022 Birthday Honours for services to association football and charity.

References
Specific

General
James, Gary – Manchester – The Greatest City 
 

1942 births
Living people
Footballers from Preston, Lancashire
Association football wingers
Association football forwards
English footballers
England under-23 international footballers
England international footballers
English Football League representative players
Swindon Town F.C. players
Manchester City F.C. players
Burnley F.C. players
Blackpool F.C. players
Stockport County F.C. players
Mossley A.F.C. players
English Football League players
UEFA Euro 1968 players
English football managers
Stockport County F.C. managers
English Football League managers
English Football Hall of Fame inductees
English businesspeople
English autobiographers
FA Cup Final players
Officers of the Order of the British Empire